Djibril Sidibé may refer to:
Djibril Sidibé (footballer, born 1982), Malian footballer
Djibril Sidibé (footballer, born 1992), French footballer